Coleorozena is a genus of case-bearing leaf beetles in the family Chrysomelidae. The group is largely composed of species that were originally placed in the genus Coscinoptera; some authorities have suggested placing these species back into Coscinoptera but the most recent revisions prefer to retain it as a separate genus.

Selected species
 Coleorozena alicula (Fall, 1927)
 Coleorozena fulvilabris (Jacoby, 1888)
 Coleorozena lecontii (Crotch, 1873)
 Coleorozena longicollis (Jacoby, 1888)
 Coleorozena pilatei (Lacordaire, 1848)
 Coleorozena subnigra (Schaeffer, 1905)
 Coleorozena vittata (J. L. LeConte, 1858)

References

Further reading

 
 

Clytrini
Articles created by Qbugbot
Chrysomelidae genera